Tessaoua is a department of the Maradi Region in Niger. Its capital lies at the city of Tessaoua. As of 2011, the department had a total population of 479,384 people.

Towns and villages
Awandawaki
Badéta Haousa
Chabaré
Dan Aro
Dan Gado
Dan Kori
Dan Saga
Dan Takyara
Danko
Digaba
Diossi
Dogon Dawa
Dogon Tabki
El Dania
Gabaouri 
Guidan Agalé
Guidan Anné
Guidan Zougao
Issawan
Jikata
Kagoum
Kalgo
Kinkalé Majikay
Korgom
Kougome
Koumchi
Majiniawa
May Guézaoua
May Jirgui
May Sara
Mayahi
Ourafane
Takaji 
Tessaoua (capital)
Toki
Yataoua
Zaroumey

References

Departments of Niger
Maradi Region